Zeta is an extinct town in Stoddard County, in the U.S. state of Missouri.

A post office called Zeta was established in 1895, and remained in operation until 1936. The community was named after the Greek letter zeta.

References

Ghost towns in Missouri
Former populated places in Stoddard County, Missouri
1895 establishments in Missouri